The Garhwal Brigade was an infantry brigade of the British Indian Army that formed part of the Indian Army during the First World War.  It was formed in April 1917 to replace the original Garhwal Brigade that had been mobilized in August 1914 as the 20th (Garhwal) Brigade for service on the Western Front.  It remained in India throughout the war.

History
At the outbreak of the First World War, the Garhwal Brigade was part of the 7th (Meerut) Division.  It was mobilized in August 1914 with the division as the 20th (Garhwal) Brigade and sailed from Bombay on 20 September for the Western Front.  The 7th Meerut Divisional Area was formed in September 1914 to take over the area responsibilities of the 7th (Meerut) Division.  It was not until April 1917 that a new Garhwal Brigade was formed in 7th Meerut Divisional Area to replace the original brigade.  It mainly commanded Gurkha and Garhwal depots, particularly at Lansdowne.  The brigade served with the division in India throughout the war.

The brigade continued to exist after the end of the war.  It was designated as 70th Indian Infantry Brigade from May to September 1920 and 17th Indian Infantry Brigade from September 1920 when it was based at Dehra Dun.  It was broken up thereafter.

Order of battle
The brigade commanded the following units during the First World War.
 3rd Battalion, 39th Garhwal Rifles (joined in April 1917 from Dehra Dun; left in November 1917 for 4th (Rawalpindi) Brigade)
 3rd Battalion, 8th Gurkha Rifles (formed in July 1917; left in April 1918 for Kohat Brigade)

Commanders
The Garhwal Brigade / 70th Indian Brigade / 17th Indian Brigade had the following commanders:

See also

 20th (Garhwal) Brigade for the original brigade

Notes

References

Bibliography

External links
 

Brigades of India in World War I
Military units and formations established in 1917